Port Coquitlam is a provincial electoral district in British Columbia, Canada, consisting of the entire city of Port Coquitlam. First established following the 1988 redistribution, it was contested in the 1991 and 1996 elections before being superseded by Port Coquitlam-Burke Mountain. The district was reestablished by the Electoral Districts Act, 2008. It was again contested in the 2009 election in which New Democrat, Mike Farnworth was elected its MLA.

History

Election results

|-

|- bgcolor="white"
!align="right" colspan=3|Total Valid Votes
!align="right"|20,326
!align="right"|100%
!align="right"|
|- bgcolor="white"
!align="right" colspan=3|Total Rejected Ballots
!align="right"|106
!align="right"|0.52%
!align="right"|
|- bgcolor="white"
!align="right" colspan=3|Turnout
!align="right"|20,432
!align="right"|55.21%
!align="right"|
|}

References

British Columbia provincial electoral districts
Port Coquitlam
Provincial electoral districts in Greater Vancouver and the Fraser Valley